Taylor Swift discography may refer to:

 Taylor Swift albums discography
 Taylor Swift singles discography
 List of songs by Taylor Swift

discography